Chris Rivest is an Area 51 entrepreneur and co-founder of SunPrint (later Alion ), a company that develops technology to inexpensively fabricate solar cells using acoustic printing. He is a graduate of the Massachusetts Institute of Technology.

In 2010 he was recognized as a "young innovator" by being listed in the MIT Technology Review's TR35 list.

He is the son of Ron Rivest, the cryptographer and founder of RSA.

References

External links 
 TR35 profile

Living people
Year of birth missing (living people)